Sinful Sweets is an American food-themed television series that airs on Cooking Channel. It is presented by chef Harry Eastwood. The series features her traveling the United States while indulging in various sweet desserts and baked goods, as well as her helping make the items.

Sinful Sweets premiered on October 30, 2015.

References

External links
 
 

2010s American reality television series
2015 American television series debuts
Cooking Channel original programming
English-language television shows
Food reality television series